Momir Korunović, was a Serbian architect best-known for his projects built in Serbo-Byzantine Revival. He was sometimes called the Serbian Gaudi.

Korunović finished his higher education in Belgrade and went on to finish postgraduate studies at Czech Technical University in Prague, after being granted a scholarship provided by Ministry of Education of Serbia. He worked as a government official in the Ministry of Construction and was responsible for construction of a number of Sokol movement buildings, a wooden stadium, churches and other prominent buildings, with total of 143 authored projects.

Selected works

See also
 List of Serbian architects
 Milan Antonović
 Dragutin Dragiša Milutinović

References

Literature 
 Đurić Zamolo, Divna, Graditelji Beograda, 1815-1914
 Kadijević, Aleksandar, Momir Korunović, 1996

1883 births
1969 deaths
Serbian architects
People from Jagodina